Kita District may refer to:

 Kita District, Ehime
 Kita District, Kagawa